Bredyia is a genus of ammonites from the lower part of the Middle Jurassic, found in Europe and North America.

Bredyia is a member of the Hammatoceratidae, a family which comprises part of the Hildoceratoidea. Its shell is involute, strongly ribbed, with a small  umbilicus. Whorls are strongly embracing; ribs thick, radially straight on the sides, curves forward on the venter but do not meet. The sides or flanks are outwardly bowed. The venter has a narrow keel and may be fastigate, like a gable roof.

References 

 W.J. Arkell et al., 1957. Mesozoic Ammonoidea, Treatise on Invertebrate Paleontology, Part L, Ammonoidea. Geological Society of America.
Bredyia in Fossilworks Gateway
Hammatoceratidae in Ammonites et Autres Spirales (Fr).
 Louis Rulleau, 2009. Les Hammatoceratidae et les Erycitidae NW européens et téthysiens du lias et du dogger.

Hammatoceratidae
Ammonitida genera